General elections were held in Saint Lucia on 2 July 1979. The result was a victory for the Saint Lucia Labour Party, which won twelve of the seventeen seats. Voter turnout was 68.0%.

Results

References

Saint Lucia
Elections in Saint Lucia
1979 in Saint Lucia
July 1979 events in North America